Panopea abrupta is an extinct species of large marine bivalve mollusc in the family Hiatellidae. Between 1983 and 2010, this species of clam was confused with the Pacific geoduck, Panopea generosa, in the scientific literature.

References

Hiatellidae